The drab whistler (Pachycephala griseonota) is a species of bird in the family Pachycephalidae.
It is found in the Maluku Islands. Its natural habitat is subtropical or tropical moist lowland forests.

Taxonomy and systematics
Some authorities have considered the drab whistler as several subspecies of the rufous whistler.

Subspecies
Five subspecies are recognized:
 P. g. lineolata - Wallace, 1863, 1876: Originally described as a separate species. Found on Sula Islands
 P. g. cinerascens - Salvadori, 1878: Originally described as a separate species. Found on southern Lau Islands
 P. g. examinata - Hartert, 1898: Originally described as a separate species. Found on Buru (southern Moluccas)
 P. g. griseonota - Gray, G.R. 1862: Found on Seram Island (southern Moluccas)
 P. g. kuehni - Hartert, 1898: Originally described as a separate species. Found on the Kai Islands

Additionally, some authorities consider the cinnamon-breasted whistler to also be a subspecies of the drab whistler (as P. g. johni).

References

drab whistler
Birds of the Maluku Islands
drab whistler
drab whistler
Taxonomy articles created by Polbot